Jāmeh Mosque of Zavareh, Congregation mosque of Zavareh, Friday mosque of Zavareh or Grand mosque of Zavareh is the grand congregational mosque of the city of Zavareh in the Isfahan Province of Iran.

An inscription in the entrance stucco dates this Seljuk-era mosque to 1135-1136, making it the first-known mosque constructed according to a four-iwan plan in post-Islamic Iran.

Centrally located in the pre-Islamic city of Zavareh, this mosque is the earliest dated example of a four-iwan scheme. Contrary to most Seljuk mosques, the inscription containing the date and the patronage for the building is on the courtyard façade. Although this information is not completely preserved, a date of 1135 (530 AH) can be established for this building. The patron of the mosque is identified as Abu Taher Hosein bin Ghali bin Ahmad. In another inscription on the eastern side of the south iwan, the date of the mihrab is recorded as 1156 (551 ).

See also
 Islam in Iran

References 

Mosques in Isfahan Province
Buildings and structures in Isfahan Province
National works of Iran
Mosque buildings with domes
Zavareh
1130s establishments in Asia